Ponnapati Antony Reddy (1 December 1908 – c. 1985) was an Indian politician belonging to the Indian National Congress. He was elected to the Lok Sabha, the lower house  of the Indian Parliament, from Anantapur, Andhra Pradesh in 1967 and 1971. He was a student of St. John's High School in Bellary and St. Joseph's College, Tiruchirappalli.

References

1908 births
1980s deaths
India MPs 1967–1970
India MPs 1971–1977
Indian National Congress politicians from Andhra Pradesh
Lok Sabha members from Andhra Pradesh
People from Kurnool district